Aframomum orientale is a species in the ginger family, Zingiberaceae. It was first described by John Michael Lock. It is listed as endangered by IUCN.

Range
The native range of Aframomum orientale  is from Southeast Kenya to East Tanzania.

References 

orientale